The Main road 331 is a short bypass direction Secondary class main road near Mezőkövesd, that connects the M3 motorway's Mezőkövesd interchange to the Main road 3. The road is  km long.

The road, as well as all other main roads in Hungary, is managed and maintained by Magyar Közút, state owned company.

Sources

See also

 Roads in Hungary
 Transport in Hungary

External links
 Hungarian Public Road Non-Profit Ltd. (Magyar Közút Nonprofit Zrt.)
 National Infrastructure Developer Ltd.

Main roads in Hungary
Borsod-Abaúj-Zemplén County